Pilipinas Legends is a men's professional basketball league in the Philippines organized by Sports Legends Managers Inc., and composed of former players from the Philippine Basketball Association and minor leagues. Chito Loyzaga is the league's commissioner. Founded by Filipino businessman, Dick Balajadia, he said that "We created this league for our basketball stars to continue inspiring the youth, as well as give back to the community by participating in our advocacy centered on nation-building."

On October 17, 2015, it was announced that the league will take over control of the Pacquiao Powervit Pilipinas Aguilas in the ASEAN Basketball League, led by the Legends' founder Dick Balajadia.

Notable players
Among the initial players who expressed interest to participate in the tournament are Marlou Aquino, Alvin Patrimonio, Nelson Asaytono, Jerry Codiñera, Willie Miller, Kenneth Duremdes, Poch Juinio, Aries Dimaunahan and Johnedel Cardel.

Teams

MX3, a leading supplement brand, and GoldLife, a multi-level marketing company have confirmed their participation in the 2015 inaugural tournament.  A premiere oil company and a supplement brand also expressed interest in sponsoring their own respective team.

Exhibition games
During the Kadayawan Festival in Davao City last August 17, MX3 Pilipinas Legends beat the Davao All-Stars during the exhibition game at Almendras Gym in Davao City. Egay Billones, Gerome Ejercito, Nelson Asaytono, Rodney Santos, Johnny Abarrientos and Alvin Patrimonio are among the PBA legends who played in the exhibition game.

References

Basketball leagues in the Philippines